Richard Manliffe Barrington (Fassaroe near Bray, 1849 – Dublin, 15 September 1915) was an Irish naturalist.
 
Barrington was a farmer and land valuer. He was educated at Trinity College where he gained an M.A. He wrote reports on the flora of Lough Ree, Lough Erne, Ben Bulben, Tory Island and the Blaskets all published by the Royal Irish Academy but most of his scientific papers are on birds. His best known work is The migration of birds, as observed at Irish lighthouses and lightships including the original reports from 1888–97, now published for the first time, and an analysis of these and of the previously put together with an appendix giving the measurements of about 1600 wings London : R.H. Porter   Only 350 copies of this 667 page work were printed.

Barrington was one of the leaders of the Royal Irish Academy Rockall expedition of 1896 with Robert Lloyd Praeger and John A. Harvie Brown of Dunipace (1844–1916), a Scottish gentleman naturalist.
 
His collection of bird specimens (wings and legs of birds collected by light-keepers)  stored in paper envelopes are conserved in the National Museum of Ireland and the Ulster Museum.

Barrington was a Fellow of the Linnean Society, a Member of the British Ornithologists' Union, and of the British Association Committee for obtaining Observations on the Migration of  Birds at Light- houses and Lightships formed to study bird migration. He was also interested in mammals.

See also
 Amy Barrington teacher, scientist and family historian
 Charles Barrington mountaineer

References

Irish Naturalist 24: 193.
Journal of Botany  1915:364  
James Britten &  Gerorge S. Boulger 1931 "Bibliographical Index of Deceased British and Irish Botanists" Ed. 2, 22 
Some Irish naturalists: a biographical note-book

External links
 Habitas Partial bibliography
 
 

Irish ornithologists
19th-century Irish botanists
1849 births
1915 deaths
People from Bray, County Wicklow
Year of birth uncertain
20th-century Irish botanists